The 2021 NRL Grand Final was the conclusive and premiership-deciding game of the 2021 National Rugby League season in Australia. It was contested between the Penrith Panthers and the South Sydney Rabbitohs on Sunday 3 October at Suncorp Stadium in Brisbane. Penrith won the match 14–12 to claim their third premiership title, and their first since 2003. Penrith co-captain and halfback Nathan Cleary was awarded the Clive Churchill Medal as the official man of the match.

The event was held in Brisbane for the first time in the competition's history due to an ongoing COVID-19 lockdown in New South Wales which prompted the NRL to relocate it from Stadium Australia in Sydney, where every NRL Grand Final since 1999 had been hosted.  Due to COVID-19 restrictions, the match was attended by only 39,322 spectators because the Queensland Government limited Suncorp Stadium to seventy-five percent of its maximum capacity.

The match was preceded by the 2021 Queensland Cup preliminary finals and broadcast live throughout Australia by the Nine Network, with pre-match and half-time entertainment headlined by Kate Miller-Heidke, Ian Moss, The Stafford Brothers, Timmy Trumpet, William Barton and a forty-piece Queensland orchestra.

This was the last game to be commentated by long-time announcer Ray Warren.

Background
This was the first ever NRL Grand Final between the Penrith Panthers and the South Sydney Rabbitohs, and the first time since 2014 that the Grand Final featured two Sydney-based clubs. The Penrith side aimed for a third premiership, after defeating Canberra Raiders in 1991 and Sydney Roosters in 2003. It was also Ivan Cleary's third Grand Final appearance as a coach, after losing with the New Zealand Warriors against Manly Sea Eagles in 2011, and losing with the Penrith side against Melbourne Storm in 2020. Meanwhile, the Rabbitohs were aiming for their 22nd premiership victory; their most recent being against Canterbury-Bankstown Bulldogs in 2014. It was also Wayne Bennett's tenth Grand Final appearance as a coach after winning seven of the previous nine.

After finishing as minor premiers and runners-up in 2020, the Panthers finished the 2021 regular season in second place after twenty-one wins and three losses.

South Sydney finished third after twenty wins and four losses. During the regular season, the Rabbitohs scored 775 points, the fourth highest of all time in competition history. Despite this, they conceded 50 points in a game twice during the home and away season, to the Panthers and the Melbourne Storm, dampening their premiership aspirations with no side ever winning the premiership after doing so. In the Rabbitohs' 54-12 victory over the Roosters in round 24, fullback Latrell Mitchell was suspended for 6 matches for reckless high contact on Joseph Manu. Rookie Blake Taaffe replaced him the next week, playing just his fourth NRL match at the time.

During the regular season, the two teams faced each other twice. In round 11, the Panthers defeated the Rabbitohs 56–12 at Apex Oval. In round 23, the Panthers won 25–12 at Suncorp Stadium. However, in a major upset in the first week of the finals Series, South Sydney defeated Penrith 16–10 at Queensland Country Bank Stadium in the Qualifying Final and advanced straight to the Preliminary Finals two weeks later, beating Manly Warringah Sea Eagles 36–16 at Suncorp Stadium to advance to the Grand Final. After losing to Souths, Penrith defeated Parramatta Eels 8–6 in the Semi-Finals one week later at BB Print Stadium. The following week, Penrith defeated the minor premiers Melbourne Storm 10–6 in what was seen as a rematch of the previous year's grand final, during the Preliminary Final at Suncorp Stadium, to advance to the Grand Final.

Pre-match

Broadcasting
The match will be broadcast live on the Nine Network and delayed on Fox League in Australia and Sky Sport in New Zealand. Radio broadcasters include ABC, Triple M, 2GB, SEN and Koori Radio.

Entertainment

Officiating

Attendance

Curtain-raiser matches
Curtain-raiser matches on the day will include two matches

Teams

Matt Burton, Spencer Leniu, Paul Momirovski and Scott Sorensen were new additions to the Penrith squad that played in the 2020 grand final. For the South Sydney side, Tom Burgess, Alex Johnston and Adam Reynolds were the only remaining players from Souths' last premiership victory in 2014. Panthers hooker Apisai Koroisau was also part of the 2014 Souths premiership-winning squad. Blake Taaffe, who replaced suspended fullback Latrell Mitchell, became the least experienced player in a grand final, playing only his eighth game in the NRL. A few days later at club level, Taaffe won the John Sattler Medal for rookie of the year. After the match, South Sydney interchange Benji Marshall retired from his NRL career with a total of 346 matches played.

Officials

Match summary

First half

Second half

Opening Games 
The NRL announced that the opening games would be the Intrust Super Cup Preliminary Finals.

1st Preliminary Final

2nd Preliminary Final

Post-match

References

2021 NRL season
NRL Grand Finals
NRL
Rugby league in Brisbane
Penrith Panthers matches
South Sydney Rabbitohs matches
NRL Grand Final
Sports competitions in Brisbane